Kovic may be a shortened form of South Slavic surnames ending with -ković:
Ron Kovic, Kovačević (born 1946), American anti-war activist
Biana Kovic, Cvetkovic, Serbian cellist and film maker 
Kovik River, sometimes Kovic, Quebec, Canada

-ković may refer to various South Slavic surnames:
Anđelković - son of Anđelko
Cvetković - son of Cvetko
Ćetković - son of Ćetko
Drašković - son of Draško
Đoković - son of Đoko
Ivankovic - son of Ivanko
Janković - son of Janko
Kovačević - son of (black)smith
Luković - son of Luko
Marković - son of Marko
Mirković - son of Mirko
Mišković - son of Miško
Novaković - son of Novak
Pavković- son of Pavko
Stanković - son of Stanko
Stojković - son of Stojko
Živković - son of Živko

In popular culture
 PFC Ković, a Serbian soldier in a video game Quake 4
 Lazlo Ković, a character in a video games Battlefield 3, and Battlefield 4

Serbian surnames